Jeffrey Keith Mullins is an American politician and former Republican member of the West Virginia Senate, where he represented the 9th district from January 14, 2015 until his resignation on January 12, 2018.

Election results

References

1965 births
Living people
People from Raleigh County, West Virginia
People from Wyoming County, West Virginia
Republican Party West Virginia state senators
Bluefield State College alumni
21st-century American politicians